Urban Rescue are an American Christian music electropop group from Los Angeles, California, who play Christian pop, Christian EDM, and contemporary worship music. They have released one notable extended play, Wild Heart, in 2016, from Rend Family Records and Capitol Christian Music Group. Their first studio album, Wild Heart, was released on May 6, 2016. In late 2017, they released a special project, City Sessions - Live in Los Angeles, that reached over 150,000 views on YouTube.

Background 
They are from Los Angeles, California, where they started in 2009.

They started as a musical entity in 2009, however their only notable extended play, Wild Heart, was released on January 29, 2016, by Rend Family Records and Capitol Christian Music Group. They released, Wild Heart, a studio album, on May 6, 2016, with Sparrow Records, Rend Family, and Capitol CMG.

Discography

Studio albums
 Wild Heart (May 6, 2016, Sparrow/Rend Family/Capitol CMG)

EPs
 Wild Heart (January 29, 2016, Sparrow/Rend Family/Capitol CMG)

Independent albums
 Listen Empty (2011)
 Re-Imagined (2015)

Independent EPs
 Urban Rescue (2009)
 Just to Be Here (2010)
 Wildfire (2014)

References

External links 

Musical groups from Los Angeles
2009 establishments in California
Musical groups established in 2009
Christian pop groups